William John Yuill (10 October 1885 – 5 October 1960) was an Australian agricultural writer, dairy industry leader and public servant. Yuill was born in Sebastian, Victoria and died in Parkville, Melbourne.

See also

References

Australian writers
Australian public servants
Australian Presbyterians
1885 births
1960 deaths